This is a list of lists of Hindu temples. List is in alphabetical order in three types: based on geographic locations and by continents; by theme; and by prime deity.

By location

Africa
 List of Hindu temples in Mauritius
 List of Hindu temples in South Africa
 List of Hindu temples in Tanzania

Asia
List of Hindu temples in Afghanistan
List of Hindu temples of Kabul
 List of Hindu temples in Bangladesh
 List of Hindu temples in Cambodia
 List of Hindu temples in India
By state:
List of Hindu temples in Andhra Pradesh
List of Hindu temples in Tirupati
List of Hindu temples in Bihar
List of Hindu temples in Goa
List of Hindu temples in Kerala
Goud Saraswat Brahmin temples in Kerala
List of Hindu temples in Tamil Nadu
List of temples in Kanchipuram
List of Hindu temples in Kumbakonam
Temples of Telangana
List of temples in Uttarakhand
By non-states:
List of Hindu temples in Bareilly
List of Chola temples in Bangalore
List of Hindu temples in Bhubaneswar
List of Hindu temples in Bishnupur
List of temples in Tulu Nadu
 List of Hindu temples in Indonesia
 List of Hindu temples in Japan
 List of Hindu temples in Laos
 List of Hindu temples in Malaysia
 List of Hindu temples in Mongolia
 List of Hindu temples in Nepal
 List of Hindu temples in Pakistan
List of temples in Lahore
List of Hindu temples in Multan
List of Hindu temples in Sindh
 List of Hindu temples in Philippines
 List of Hindu temples in Singapore
 List of Hindu temples in South Korea
 List of Hindu temples in Sri Lanka
 List of Hindu temples in Thailand
 List of Hindu temples in Vietnam

Europe
 List of Hindu temples in England
 List of Hindu temples in France
 List of Hindu temples in Germany
 List of Hindu temples in Poland
 List of Hindu temples in Switzerland
 List of Hindu temples in the United Kingdom

North America
 List of Hindu temples in the United States
List of Hindu temples in Canada
 List of Hindu temples in Trinidad and Tobago

South America
 List of Hindu temples in Guyana

By architectural or other features 
 Biggest
 List of largest Hindu temples
 List of large temple tanks
 List of tallest Gopurams
 List of largest Hindu ashrams
 Caves and rocks
 List of India cave temples
 List of rock-cut temples in India

By prime deity 

 List of Hindu deities
 Rigvedic deities
 Sun worship in Hinduism
 List of solar deities in Hinduism
 List of Sun temples in Hinduism
 Jyotisha
 Nakshatra 
 Saptarishi
 List of Natchathara temples
 Navagraha
 List of Navagraha temples
 Adityas
 List of Sun temples in Hinduism
 Surya Namaskar
 Chandra
 Ardha Chandrasana
 List of Chandra temples
 Shani
 List of Shani temples
 Shaivism
 Char Dham
 Chota Char Dham
 64 original Jyotirlinga
 List of 12 Maha Jyotirlinga
 List of 108 Shiva Temples
 List of Bhairava temples
 List of Ganesha temples
 List of Shiva temples in India
 List of Indus Valley Civilization sites (Proto-haivism and Proto-Shaktism)
 Shaktism
 List of 51 Shakti Pitha
 List of Mansa Devi temples
 List of Shakti peeth in Bengal
 List of Indus Valley Civilization sites (Proto-haivism and Proto-Shaktism)
 Vaishnavism
 Divya desam
 Worship of sacred objects: 
 Sacred rivers
 Rigvedic rivers
 Sapta Sindhu
 Triveni Sangam of Ganga, Yamuna, and Sarasvati rivers.
 Narmada
 Sacred groves of India
 List of largest sacred Banyan trees in India
 Triveni, Panchvati and sacred plants and flowers in Hinduism
 Sacred mountains of Hinduism 
 Mount Kailash
 Sarasvatotri mountain
 Gangotri mountain
 Yamunotri mountain
 Dhosi Hill (where Chyavanprash originated)
 Nanda Devi
 Om Parvat
 Saraswati Parbat I
 Saraswati Parbat II
 Sacred pre-historic megaliths of India
 Sacred dolmens of India
 Sacred menhirs of India

See also 

 Hindu eschatology
 Hindu pilgrimage sites
 Hindu temple architecture
 List of Hindu temples outside India
 List of human stampedes in Hindu temples
 Sapta Puri, seven holy pilgrimage centres in India
 Yatra, a Hindu pilgrimage

References

Temples
 
Hinduism-related lists